The Meyerhoff Scholars Program is a program at the University of Maryland, Baltimore County (UMBC) designed to prepare minority students for academic careers in the science, technology, engineering and math (STEM) disciplines.  The program has served as a model for developing and supporting minority students pursuing academic careers.

History

The program was founded at the UMBC in 1988 with a $500,000 grant from the Robert and Jane Meyerhoff Foundation, under the guidance of future UMBC President Freeman A. Hrabowski III. In the program's first year, it admitted only male African American students; female African American students were admitted in the program's second year. In 1997, the program opened to students of all races who were interested in supporting the advancement of minorities in academia, following the 1995 U.S. Supreme Court decision ruling the Benjamin Banneker Scholarship Program, another UMBC scholarship which had been only open to African American students, unconstitutional.

Education Research
The Meyerhoff Scholars Program is noted for its success in increasing the representation of minority students in STEM. In an attempt to determine whether this model can be replicated at large universities, two scholarships were founded at other universities in 2013: the Chancellor's Science Scholarship at the University of North Carolina at Chapel Hill, and the Millennium Scholars Program at Pennsylvania State University.

Notable alumni
 Jerome Adams: anesthesiologist and the 20th surgeon general of the United States
 Kizzmekia Corbett: viral immunologist at the NIAID (NIH) who helped develop one of the  COVID-19 vaccines
 Kafui Dzirasa: psychiatrist and professor at Duke University
 Lola Eniola-Adefeso: Chemical Engineer and the University Diversity and Social Transformation Professor at the University of Michigan College of Engineering
 Anna Gifty Opoku-Agyeman: activist, writer, economist, and co-founder and former CEO of the Sadie Collective
 Crystal C. Watkins Johansson: neuroscientist, psychiatrist, and professor at Johns Hopkins University School of Medicine

References

Further reading 
Beating the Odds: Raising Academically Successful African American Males (1998), Freeman A. Hrabowski, Geoffrey L. Greif, Kenneth I. Maton, Publisher: Oxford University Press
Overcoming the Odds: Raising Academically Successful African American Young Women (2001), Freeman A. Hrabowski, Geoffrey L. Greif, Kenneth I. Maton, Monica L. Greene, Publisher: Oxford University Press
 Editorial: Why American College Students Hate Science (The New York Times, May 25, 2006)
Paper: Preparing Minority Scientists and Engineers American Association for the Advancement of Science, Science 31 March 2006)
Article: Fulfilling the Expectations of Excellence (American Association for the Advancement of Science, 2005)
Article: It's Cool to be Smart (Fast Company, 2002)

External links
Official site
The Meyerhoff Scholars Program 30th Anniversary Celebration
Chancellor's Science Scholarship
Penn State Millennium Scholars Program

University of Maryland, Baltimore County
Student financial aid in the United States
Scholarships in the United States